Wyboston, Chawston and Colesden is a civil parish located in the Borough of Bedford in Bedfordshire, in England.

The parish includes the village of Wyboston, and the smaller settlements of Chawston and Colesden. These villages used to form part of the Roxton parish, but became independent in May 2007.

The small hamlet of Begwary is also within the parish. The hamlet contains Begwary Brook, a marshland nature reserve.

Geography
The £120,000 section of the A1 from the Black Cat A428 (now A421) roundabout to the start of the Eaton Socon bypass opened in 1959.

References

External links

 Wyboston, Chawston and Colesden Parish Web Site

Civil parishes in Bedfordshire
Borough of Bedford